Merthan Açıl (born 15 February 1982 in Istanbul, Turkey) is a Turkish former professional footballer.

References

External links

1982 births
Living people
Footballers from Istanbul
Turkish footballers
Bakırköyspor footballers
Çaykur Rizespor footballers
İstanbul Başakşehir F.K. players
Giresunspor footballers
Kasımpaşa S.K. footballers
Adanaspor footballers
Ümraniyespor footballers
Süper Lig players
TFF First League players
Association football midfielders